Lori Idlout  (born March 28, 1974) is a Canadian politician who has served as member of parliament for the riding of Nunavut in the House of Commons of Canada since 2021. She is a member of the New Democratic Party.

Before her election, Idlout practiced law in Iqaluit with her own firm, Qusugaq Law. She represented the group protesting against the Baffinland Iron Mine's expansion, as well as serving as the technical adviser for the Ikajutit Hunters and Trappers Organization during a public hearing on the issue.

Idlout's nomination meeting vote was tied with Inuit educational YouTuber Aliqa Illauq. On August 10, 2021, Idlout secured the NDP nomination to run as their candidate for the riding of Nunavut by a coin toss, a first for the territory. She was elected to succeed outgoing MP Mumilaaq Qaqqaq in the 2021 Canadian federal election, who did not seek re-election after one term in Parliament.

Personal life and career
Idlout was raised with three siblings and grew up in the Northwest Territories (now Nunavut) as a child. Her family moved between the communities of Igloolik, Pond Inlet, Rankin Inlet, and Chesterfield Inlet. Idlout spent the most time in Igloolik, and currently resides there.

Idlout is the mother to two daughters, Mylena and Crystal. Both are familiar with katajjaq, and the two sung at their mother's victory party.

Between 2004 and 2011, Idlout served as the executive director of the Nunavut Embrace Life Council, a not-for-profit organization committed to suicide prevention. Idlout's time as its executive director saw expansion to its services and securing a budget to address issues of mental health. Idlout had previously worked for Nunavut's Department of Health and Nunavut Tunngavik Incorporated as a policy analyst, and was the founder of Coalition of Nunavut DEAs as a director of the Iqaluit District Education Authority in order to advocate for educational services.

Idlout received a bachelor's degree in psychology from Lakehead University in 1997, and a Juris Doctor from the University of Ottawa (2018).

Policy positions

Idlout told Carol Off of CBC Radio's As It Happens that she intended to work on shifting the balance between the federal government and the people of Nunavut. She discussed that while the federal government wished to acquire Nunavut's resources, she wanted to "get the federal government to realize that [Nunavummiut] can negotiate ... in a position of power." Idlout stated she wanted to see the territory benefit more from the ongoing mining and exploration conducted within its land.

During her campaign, Idlout prioritized on youth engagement within the electoral process. She raised the issue of youth empowerment within her election tour.

Housing and infrastructure
Idlout stated her utmost priority was addressing the housing crisis in the North, which included more housing as well as housing quality and renovation; addressing the mold crisis that many houses had. Idlout acknowledged the adverse health outcomes that came as a result of poor living conditions and as a result of mold and the disproportionate effects it would have on the elderly. She expressed her concern that the incumbent Liberal government would fail to properly address the housing situation in the North, stating Trudeau "promised more housing funds for the last six years".

Idlout stated she intended to work with the government for further infrastructure upgrades, including rural broadband and improvement for airports within the territory.

Mining and resource management
In reaction to Baffinland's proposed Mary River Mine expansion, Idlout stated that the current plan as it stood should not go through. Idlout stressed the importance of consultation with local communities regarding the issue, and that the mine had already had an outsized impact on the local environment. She cited the waste material that was produced as a result of the mining in the area, and that Baffinland should work with Inuit to address the issues raised.

Elder care
Idlout expressed her concerns for the relocation of community elders to Edmonton and Ottawa as a result of the lack of proper facilities for elder care in Nunavut. She expressed her support for the creation of the proper facilities within the territory to enable elders to remain within their own communities, thus creating further employment opportunities within the territory. Idlout also stated the financial supplements for elders within the territory was "inadequate" and addressed the possibility of raising the supplement for northern communities.

Electoral Record

References

External links

Members of the House of Commons of Canada from Nunavut
New Democratic Party MPs
People from Igloolik
21st-century Canadian politicians
21st-century Canadian women politicians
Inuit politicians
Living people
Women members of the House of Commons of Canada
Indigenous Members of the House of Commons of Canada
1974 births